Ethiopia, also known as the Derg, competed at the 1980 Summer Olympics in Moscow, USSR. The nation returned to the Olympic Games after boycotting the 1976 Summer Olympics in Montreal, Quebec, Canada. 41 competitors, 39 men and 2 women, took part in 26 events in 3 sports.

Medalists

Gold
 Miruts Yifter — Athletics, Men's 5000 metres
 Miruts Yifter — Athletics, Men's 10000 metres

Bronze
 Mohamed Kedir — Athletics, Men's 10000 metres
 Eshetu Tura — Athletics, Men's 3000 metres Steeplechase

Athletics

Men's 100 metres
 Besha Tuffa
 Heat — 11.55 (→ did not advance)

Men's 200 metres
 Besha Tuffa
 Heat — 23.18 (→ did not advance)

Men's 800 metres
 Abebe Zerihun 
 Heat — 1:50.3 (→ did not advance)
 Nigusse Bekele 
 Heat — 1:51.1 (→ did not advance)
 Atre Bezabeh 
 Heat — 1:52.7 (→ did not advance)

Men's 1,500 metres
Kassa Balcha
 Heat — 3:43.1 (→ did not advance)
Haile Zeru
 Heat — 3:45.7 (→ did not advance)
Nigusse Bekele
 Heat — 3:45.8 (→ did not advance)

Men's 5,000 metres
 Miruts Yifter
 Heat — 13:44.4
 Semi Final — 13:40.0
 Final — 13:21.0 (→  Gold Medal)
 Yohannes Mohamed
 Heat — 13:45.8
 Semi Final — 13:39.4
 Final — 13:28.4 (→ 10th place)
 Mohamed Kedir
 Heat — 13:42.7
 Semi Final — 13:28.6
 Final — 13:34.2 (→ 12th place)

Men's 10,000 metres
 Miruts Yifter
 Heat — 28:41.7
 Final — 27:42.7 (→  Gold Medal)
 Mohamed Kedir
 Heat — 28:16.4
 Final — 27:44.7 (→  Bronze Medal)
 Tolossa Kotu
 Heat — 28:55.3
 Final — 27:46.5 (→ 4th place)

Men's Marathon
 Dereje Nedi
 Final — 2:12:44 (→ 7th place)
 Moges Alemayehu
 Final — 2:18:40 (→ 24th place)
 Kebede Balcha
 Final — did not finish (→ no ranking)

Men's 4x400 metres Relay
 Besha Tuffa, Kumela Fituma, Asfaw Deble, and Atre Bezabeh
 Heat — 3:18.2 (→ did not advance)

Men's 3,000 m Steeplechase
 Eshetu Tura
 Heat — 8:23.8 
 Semifinals — 8:16.2 
 Final — 8:13.6 (→  Bronze  Medal)
 Hailu Wolde-Tsadik
 Heat — 8:41.0 
 Semifinals — 8:35.0 (→ did not advance)
 Girma Wolde-Hana
 Heat — 8:54.6 (→ did not advance)

Men's Long Jump
 Abebe Gessese
 Qualification — 6.66 m (→ did not advance)

Men's Triple Jump
Yadessa Kuma
 Qualification — 13.60 m (→ did not advance)

Men's Javelin Throw
 Milkessa Chalchisa
 Qualification — 51.04 m (→ did not advance, 18th place)

Men's 20 km Walk
 Tekeste Mitiku
 Final — 1:45:45.7 (→ 23rd place)

Women's 800 metres
 Fantaye Sirak
 Heat — 2:08.7 (→ did not advance)

Women's 1,500 metres
 Amsale Woldegibriel
 Heat — 4:25.3 (→ did not advance)

Boxing

Men's Light Flyweight (– 48 kg)
 Beruk Asfaw
First Round — lost to Antti Juntumaa (Finland) after knock-out in first round

Men's Flyweight (– 51 kg)
 Hassen Sherif
 First Round — Defeated Aguibou Barry (Guinea) after disqualification in second round 
 Second Round — Lost to Petar Lesov (Bulgaria) on points (0-5)

Men's Bantamweight (– 54 kg)
 Ayele Mohammed
 First Round — Bye
 Second Round — Defeated Ahmad Nesar (Afghanistan) on points (5-0)  
 Third Round — Lost to Juan Hernández (Cuba) after referee stopped contest in second round

Men's Featherweight (– 57 kg)
 Leoul Nearaio
 First Round — Bye
 Second Round — Defeated Ramy Zialor (Seychelles) on points (3-2)
 Third Round — Lost to Sidnei Dalrovere (Brazil) on points (0-5)

Men's Lightweight (– 60 kg)
 Tadesse Haile
 First Round — Lost to Florian Livadaru (Romania) after disqualification in third round

Men's Light-Welterweight (– 63,5 kg)
 Ebrahim Saide
 First Round — Lost to José Angel Molina (Puerto Rico) on points (0-5)

Cycling

Eight cyclists represented Ethiopia in 1980.

Individual road race
 Zeragaber Gebrehiwot
 Jemal Rogora
 Tilahun Woldesenbet
 Musse Yohannes

Team time trial
 Haile Micael Kedir
 Ayele Mekonnen
 Tadesse Mekonnen
 Tilahun Alemayehu

References

External links
Official Olympic Reports
International Olympic Committee results database

1980 in Ethiopian sport
Nations at the 1980 Summer Olympics
1980 Summer Olympics